Shuizhu is a Chinese dish which originated from the cuisine of Sichuan province and the name literally means "water boiled (meat)". The preparation of this dish usually involves some sort of meat, usually beef, which is then called "shǔizhǔròupiàn" or fish when it's called "shǔizhǔyúpiàn", chili pepper, and a large amount of vegetable oil.

The meat is prepared with water, starch, and a slight amount of salt. Boiled vegetables are placed at the bottom of the serving bowl or dish. The prepared raw meat is poached in water that is heated to boiling point for 20–30 seconds, just enough to remove rawness yet preserving the meat's tenderness. Then it is drained and put in the serving dish with vegetables. Minced dried chili, sichuan pepper, minced garlic, and other seasoning are spread over the meat. Vegetable oil is heated in a pan nearly to smoking point, then poured over the prepared meat and vegetable.

This dish maintains tenderness of the meat by poaching it instead of stir frying. It offers a good combination of tender meat, freshness of vegetable, hot spicy flavor of chili pepper, and numbing sensation of Sichuan pepper.

External links
Chinese food - Shui zhu
Boiled Fish

Sichuan cuisine
Meat dishes